Scaphiopus is a genus of North American amphibian commonly referred to as the North American spadefoots, southern spadefoots, or eastern spadefoot toads. They differ greatly from true toads (those of the family Bufonidae) by having eyes with vertical pupils, no parotoid gland, and relatively smooth skin. Their most distinctive feature is a spade-like projection on their hind feet, from which their common name is derived. This projection enables spadefoot toads to dig in loose soils with ease.

Species 
Scaphiopus species were once classified with their European cousins in the family Pelobatidae, but have since been reclassified to their own family, Scaphiopodidae, with other North American species. There are three species in the genus Scaphiopus:

Couch's spadefoot, Scaphiopus couchii Baird, 1854  
Eastern spadefoot, Scaphiopus holbrookii (Harlan, 1835)  
Hurter's spadefoot, Scaphiopus hurterii , 1910

Geographic range 
Spadefoot toads are found throughout the United States and into northern Mexico. They tend to prefer dry, grassland areas with loose, sandy soils that flood in the rainy season.

Description 
Scaphiopus are generally colored appropriately with greens and browns to camouflage themselves in their native habitat. At adult size they are usually not much larger than 8 cm.

Behaviour, diet, and reproduction 
Spadefoot toads are nocturnal and are rarely seen when it hasn't rained recently. They spend most of the time during the dry season buried in the ground in aestivation. When it rains, they emerge to feed on invertebrates and to breed in vernal pools. They have one of the fastest reproductive cycles of any amphibian species. Once laid, eggs hatch in a matter of a day or two. The tadpoles are capable of developing to froglets within a couple of weeks. This feature is primarily due to fact that most of their breeding areas dry quickly once the rainy season is over.

Related species 
Genus Spea, western spadefoot toads
Plains spadefoot, Spea bombifrons (Cope, 1863)
Western spadefoot Spea hammondii (Baird, 1859)
Great Basin spadefoot, Spea intermontana (Cope, 1883) 
Mexican spadefoot, Spea multiplicata (Cope, 1863)

References 

 
Amphibian genera
Taxa named by John Edwards Holbrook